During the 1986–87 English football season, Tottenham Hotspur F.C. competed in the Football League First Division.

Season summary
Tottenham enjoyed a stellar season under David Pleat. Under his management, the club finished third in the First Division, were losing finalists in the FA Cup and reached the semi-finals of the League Cup. Striker Clive Allen arguably played the most important role in Tottenham's success, scoring 33 goals in the league and 49 in all competitions as Tottenham played their best football in years. For his achievements, Allen won both the PFA Players' Player of the Year and FWA Footballer of the Year awards.

Kit
Tottenham's kits were manufactured by Hummel and sponsored by Holsten. The club retained the previous season's home shirts and white shorts, but also introduced matching navy shorts to use when necessary.  They also kept the all-blue diagonal-striped away kit, and introduced, for the first time, a third kit, identical to the away kit but rendered in a darker shade of blue.

Squad
Squad at end of season

Left club during season

Reserve squad

Transfers

In
 Mitchell Thomas - Luton Town, £275,000, 7 July
 Richard Gough - Dundee United, £700,000, 20 August
 Nico Claesen - Standard de Liège, £600,000, 3 October
 Steve Hodge - Aston Villa, £650,000, 23 December

Out
 Ian Crook - Norwich City, £80,000, 13 June
 Graham Roberts - Rangers, £450,000, December
 Mark Falco - Watford, August
 Paul Miller - Charlton Athletic, August
 Tony Parks - Oxford United, loan, December

Results

First Division
Home teams listed first
 23 August : Aston Villa 0-3 Tottenham Hotspur
 25 August : Tottenham Hotspur 1-1 Newcastle United
 30 August : Tottenham Hotspur 1-0 Manchester City
 2 September : Southampton 0-2 Tottenham Hotspur
 6 September : Arsenal 0-0 Tottenham Hotspur
 13 September : Tottenham Hotspur 1-3 Chelsea
 20 September : Leicester City 1-2 Tottenham Hotspur
 27 September : Tottenham Hotspur 2-0 Everton
 4 October : Tottenham Hotspur 0-0 Luton Town
 11 October : Liverpool 0-1 Tottenham Hotspur
 18 October : Tottenham Hotspur 1-1 Sheffield Wednesday
 25 October : Queens Park Rangers 2-0 Tottenham Hotspur
 1 November : Tottenham Hotspur 1-2 Wimbledon
 8 November : Norwich City 2-1 Tottenham Hotspur
 15 November : Tottenham Hotspur 1-0 Coventry City
 22 November : Oxford United 2-4 Tottenham Hotspur
 29 November : Tottenham Hotspur 2-3 Nottingham Forest
 7 December : Manchester United 3-3 Tottenham Hotspur
 13 December : Tottenham Hotspur 2-1 Watford
 20 December : Chelsea 0-2 Tottenham Hotspur
 26 December : Tottenham Hotspur 4-0 West Ham United
 27 December : Coventry City 4-3 Tottenham Hotspur
 1 January : Charlton Athletic 0-2 Tottenham Hotspur
 4 January : Tottenham Hotspur 1-2 Arsenal
 24 January : Tottenham Hotspur 3-0 Aston Villa
 14 February : Tottenham Hotspur 2-0 Southampton
 25 February : Tottenham Hotspur 5-0 Leicester City
 7 March : Tottenham Hotspur 1-0 Queens Park Rangers
 22 March : Tottenham Hotspur 1-0 Liverpool
 25 March : Newcastle United 0-1 Tottenham Hotspur
 28 March : Luton Town 3-1 Tottenham Hotspur
 4 April : Tottenham Hotspur 3-0 Norwich City
 7 April : Sheffield Wednesday 0-1 Tottenham Hotspur
 15 April : Manchester City 1-1 Tottenham Hotspur
 18 April : Tottenham Hotspur 1-0 Charlton Athletic
 20 April : West Ham United 2-1 Tottenham Hotspur
 22 April : Wimbledon 2-2 Tottenham Hotspur
 25 April : Tottenham Hotspur 3-1 Oxford United
 2 May : Nottingham Forest 2-0 Tottenham Hotspur
 4 May : Tottenham Hotspur 4-0 Manchester United
 9 May : Watford 1-0 Tottenham Hotspur
 11 May : Everton 1-0 Tottenham Hotspur

FA Cup
Home teams listed first
 10 January : Tottenham Hotspur 3–2 Scunthorpe United
 31 January : Tottenham Hotspur 4–0 Crystal Palace
 21 February : Tottenham Hotspur 1–0 Newcastle United
 15 March : Wimbledon 0–2 Tottenham Hotspur
 11 April : Tottenham Hotspur 4–1 Watford (@ Villa Park)
 16 May : Coventry City 3-2 Tottenham Hotspur

League Cup
Home teams listed first
 23 September: Barnsley 2–3 Tottenham Hotspur
 8 October: Tottenham Hotspur 5–3 Barnsley
 29 October: Tottenham Hotspur 5–0 Birmingham City
 18 November: Cambridge United 1–3 Tottenham Hotspur
 27 January: West Ham United 1–1 Tottenham Hotspur
 2 February: Tottenham Hotspur 5–0 West Ham United
 8 February: Arsenal 0–1 Tottenham Hotspur
 1 March: Tottenham Hotspur 1–2 Arsenal (a.e.t).
 4 March: Tottenham Hotspur 1–2 Arsenal

Statistics

Appearances and goals

{| class="wikitable" style="text-align:center"
|-
! rowspan="2" style="vertical-align:bottom;" | Pos.
! rowspan="2" style="vertical-align:bottom; width:240px" | Name
! colspan="2" style="width:85px;" | Premier League
! colspan="2" style="width:85px;" | FA Cup
! colspan="2" style="width:85px;" | EFL Cup
! colspan="2" style="width:85px;" | Total
|-
! Apps
! Goals
! Apps
! Goals
! Apps
! Goals
! Apps
! Goals
|-
| FW
| align="left" |  Clive Allen
|| 38+1 || 33 || 6 || 4 || 8+1 || 12 || 52+2 || 49
|-
| MF
| align="left" |  Paul Allen
|| 34+3 || 3 || 6 || 1 || 8+1 || 0 || 48+4 || 4
|-
| MF
| align="left" |  Ossie Ardiles
|| 15+9 || 0 || 4 || 0 || 7 || 0 || 26+9 || 0
|-
| DF
| align="left" |  Mark Bowen
|| 1+1 || 1 || 0 || 0 || 0 || 0 || 1+1 || 1
|-
| MF
| align="left" |  John Chiedozie
|| 1 || 0 || 0 || 0 || 0 || 0 || 1 || 0
|-
| FW
| align="left" |  Nico Claesen
|| 18+8 || 8 || 1+5 || 2 || 5 || 1 || 24+13 || 11
|-
| GK
| align="left" |  Ray Clemence
|| 40 || 0 || 6 || 0 || 9 || 0 || 55 || 0
|-
| FW
| align="left" |  Shaun Close
|| 1+1 || 0 || 0 || 0 || 2 || 2 || 3+1 || 2
|-
| FW
| align="left" |  Mark Falco
|| 6+1 || 0 || 0 || 0 || 0+1 || 0 || 6+2 || 0
|-
| MF
| align="left" |  Tony Galvin
|| 20+4 || 1 || 1 || 0 || 2+3 || 1 || 23+7 || 2
|-
| DF
| align="left" |  Richard Gough
|| 40 || 2 || 6 || 0 || 9 || 0 || 55 || 2
|-
| FW
| align="left" |  Phil Gray
|| 1 || 0 || 0 || 0 || 0 || 0 || 1 || 0
|-
| MF
| align="left" |  Glenn Hoddle
|| 35+1 || 3 || 6 || 1 || 8 || 4 || 49+1 || 8
|-
| MF
| align="left" |  Steve Hodge
|| 19 || 4 || 6 || 2 || 0 || 0 || 25 || 6
|-
| MF
| align="left" |  David Howells
|| 1 || 0 || 0 || 0 || 0 || 0 || 1 || 0
|-
| DF
| align="left" |  Chris Hughton
|| 9 || 0 || 2 || 0 || 0 || 0 || 11 || 0
|-
| DF
| align="left" |  Gary Mabbutt
|| 37 || 1 || 6 || 3 || 8 || 0 || 51 || 4
|-
| DF
| align="left" |  Paul Miller
|| 2 || 0 || 0 || 0 || 2+1 || 0 || 4+1 || 0
|-
| MF
| align="left" |  John Moncur
|| 1 || 0 || 0 || 0 || 0 || 0 || 1 || 0
|-
| FW
| align="left" |  Paul Moran
|| 1 || 0 || 0 || 0 || 0 || 0 || 1 || 0
|-
| DF
| align="left" |  Tim O'Shea
|| 11 || 0 || 0 || 0 || 0 || 0 || 1+1 || 0
|-
| GK
| align="left" |  Tony Parks
|| 2 || 0 || 0 || 0 || 0 || 0 || 2 || 0
|-
| DF
| align="left" |  John Polston
|| 6 || 0 || 0 || 0 || 0+1 || 0 || 6+1 || 0
|-
| DF
| align="left" |  Graham Roberts
|| 17 || 1 || 0 || 0 || 4 || 2 || 21 || 3
|-
| DF
| align="left" |  Neil Ruddock
|| 4 || 0 || 0+1 || 0 || 0 || 0 || 4+1 || 0
|-
| MF
| align="left" |  Vinny Samways
|| 1+1 || 0 || 0 || 0 || 0 || 0 || 1+1 || 0
|-
| DF
| align="left" |  Gary Stevens
|| 20 || 0 || 1+4 || 0 || 2+1 || 0 || 23+5 || 0
|-
| DF
| align="left" |  Mark Stimson
|| 1 || 0 || 0 || 0 || 0 || 0 || 1 || 0
|-
| DF
| align="left" |  Danny Thomas
|| 17 || 0 || 3 || 0 || 8 || 0 || 28 || 0
|-
| DF
| align="left" |  Mitchell Thomas
|| 35+4 || 4 || 6 || 0 || 8+1 || 0 || 49+5 || 4
|-
| MF
| align="left" |  Chris Waddle
|| 39 || 6 || 6 || 2 || 9 || 3 || 54 || 11
|-

Goal scorers

Clean sheets

References

Tottenham Hotspur F.C. seasons
Tottenham Hotspur